Griss is a surname. Notable people with the surname include:

George F. C. Griss (1898–1953), Dutch mathematician and philosopher
Irmgard Griss (born 1946), Austrian lawyer and judge

See also
Gross (surname)